Papa Kwame Amponsa, known by his stage name Mista Silva, is a British-Ghanaian musician from Brockley, London. Mista Silva released his debut EP, Full Vim, in 2012. Its success led to a record deal with Polydor in 2014.
He was the first unsigned UK Afrobeats artist to have his music playlisted by BBC 1Xtra, with well received track "Now Wats Up" . He has had his music played by national radio stations such as Capital Xtra and Kiss FM. As part of BBC 1Xtra's Destination Africa he performed on the BBC Live Lounge for Trevor Nelson He has walked for Fashion label Ashish and has been blogged about by fashion and culture publications I-D Magazine and Wonderland. When interviewed by popular online publication Noisey, BBC DJ Twin B, cited Mista Silva as one to watch for the future  The Guardian newspaper also listed Mista Silva as one of eight Afrobeats artists to listen to.

Discography

EPs

Singles

References

External links 
 

Living people
Black British male rappers
21st-century Black British male singers
English people of Ghanaian descent
People from Brockley
Rappers from London
Year of birth missing (living people)